The 1966–67 Honduran Segunda División was the first season of the Honduran Segunda División.  Under the management of Mario Griffin, Atlético Indio won the tournament after defeating C.D. Victoria in the final series and obtained promotion to the 1967–68 Honduran Liga Nacional.

Final

 Atlético Indio won 5–4 on aggregate.

References

Segunda
1966